The 2021 Crawley Borough Council election took place on 6 May 2021 to elect members of Crawley Borough Council in West Sussex, England. This was on the same day as other local elections.

Results summary

Ward results

Bewbush & North Broadfield

Broadfield

Gossops Green & North East Broadfield

Ifield

Langley Green & Tushmore

Maidenbower

Northgate & West Green

Pound Hill North & Forge Wood

Pound Hill South & Worth

Southgate

Three Bridges

Tilgate

References

Crawley
2021
2020s in West Sussex
May 2021 events in the United Kingdom